Kaloust Guedel (born October 31, 1956) is a Cyprus-born American artist of Armenian descent. He is a self-educated artist and theorist. Guedel is known as the founder of the Excessivism movement. He lives and works in Los Angeles, California since 1975.

Works
Kaloust Guedel's work explores contemporary issues often taking a critical stand on various societies shortcomings. Throughout the years, it has explored subjects as genocide, war, abuse and others. Regardless of the styles and technics he has employed, his work has been consistent with contemporary sensibility and has reflected the consciousness of its time. Guedel is the first artist who used vinyl as a medium in paintings. He has been featured in publications like Masters of Today and has been known to explore capitalism and excess in his minimalist conceptual artworks.

Kaloust Guedel presented the Excessivism movement in an exhibition "Excessivist Initiative" in LA Artcore Brewery Annex, and the Excessivism Manifesto was published in Downtown News weekly in September 2015. Downtown News, Excessivism Manifesto, September 28, 2015 page 10.

Immersive paintings
Later he discovered inlay technique as a method of investigation of immersion with his new group called Immersive paintings. When he placed one of his three-dimensional works into a painting by carving its shape out of it and inserting it into the hollow space that corresponded with the shape of the object, the result was unexpected. An ancient technique known as inlay was discovered by chance. The use of inlay is a key element of this artistic concepts. The inserted object has more visual weight, while the surrounding space, which is less conceptually important, is seen as the body of the painting. Use of the inlay produces a silhouette of the subject; most often, it is used with a contrasting background, or texture to draw attention to the main subject, which is then seen as the relationship between the two objects.

Selected exhibitions

Armenian Museum of America, Watertown, MA, 2022
The National Art Center, Tokyo, Japan, 2019
Nagasaki Fine Art Museum, Nagasaki, Japan, 2017
Yokohoma Civis Gallery At Azamino, Yokohoma, Japan, 2017
Saatchi Gallery, London, UK 2013
Bienal Internacional de Curitiba 2013, Curitiba, Brazil
Texas National/Stephen F. Austin State University, Curated by Dave Hickey, Nacogdoches, TX, 2012
Viridian Artists Gallery, Curated by Elisabeth Sussman, Whitney Museum of American Art, New York, N.Y., 2012
Busan Cultural Art Center (BIAF), Seoul, S. Korea, 2008
Beijing GuanYinTang Art Street (GIAF), Beijing, China, 2008
Seojong Center (GIAF), Seoul, S. Korea, 2008
Museum of Modern Art, Yerevan, Armenia, 2005
Forest Lawn Museum, Los Angeles, CA, 2003
Butler Institute of American Art, Youngstown, OH, 1986

Awards and commendations

Laura Friedman, Assemblymember, 43rd Assembly District, April 19, 2019
Anthony Portantino, Senator, April 19, 2019
Marquis Who's Who in American Art Lifetime Achievement, 2017
ArtSlant 1ST 2015 PRIZE SHOWCASE WINNER
Adam B. Schiff, Member of  Congress, April 25, 2013
Ara Najarian, Council Member Chair, June 18, 2009
Frank Quintero, Mayor of Glendale, April 25, 2003
New American Paintings, Number 31, by The Open Studios Press, 2000

Bibliography

Digital Journal, An Innovative Approach to Bringing Historical Roots to Contemporary Art, Sept. 27, 2022
Boston Herald, How A Los Angeles Artist Transforms An Ancient Chinese Technique Into Contemporary Painting, September 08, 2022 
Fashion Thinking: Creative Approaches to the Design Process, by Fiona Dieffenbacher, 2021
Irony, imbalance and study at the heart of excessivism, Fahrenheit Magazine, March 13, 2021 
New American Paintings, 2020 Featured Artists / Recent Work, 2020
Artillery Magazine, THE NOTHING THAT IS, by Genie Davis, November 20, 2019
The Best modern and Contemporary Artists, by Salvator Russo and Francesco Saverio Russo, 2017 
Art & Museum, (page 48) Autumn 2017
HotArtStuff, WALLS: A quest for immersive space in DTLA's newest collaborative studio/project, PRODUCE HAUS, By Shana Nys Dambrot, March 22, 2017
Diversions LA, All That Glitters, by Genie Davis January 6, 2017
Artillery Magazine
Light And Space,
West Hollywood Lifestyle, Expansive Space Inside The Historic 7th Street Market Features New Work
LA Art Party, Celebrate the Art of Zadikian, Kaloust Guedel, and KuBO! by Kathy Leonardo
Artcopyblog, KALOUST GUEDEL’S EXCESSIVISM AND THE RISE OF DONALD TRUMP, by Brenda Haroutunian, JUNE 26, 2016
WideWalls Magazine, Excessivism - A Phenomenon Every Art Collector Should Know, by Angie Kordic, January 2016
Նոր Ուղղութիւն Արուեստում՝ Պարտադրում Է Ժամանակակից Մարդը, Asbarez, (Armenian), by Ani Tadevosyan, January 13, 2016
Abstre Sanat Akımı, Soyut Resim, Abstract, 2016
Gallereo Magazine, The Newest Art Movement You've Never Heard of, Nov. 20, 2015
CaliforniaNewswire, New Art Movement, Excessivism, is a Commentary on Economic Materialism, Nov. 02, 2015
Miemi Herald, Excessivism is Best Kept Secret in the Art World, Nov. 02, 2015
Downtown News, Excessivism Manifesto, September 28, 2015, page 10
The Huffington Post, Excessivism: Irony, *Imbalance and a New Rococo, by Shana Nys Dambrot, art critic, curator,  September 23, 2015
Effetto Arte, July/August, 2015 
Bare Hill Publishing,  Installation & Site Specific #2, 2015, Hardcover : 
Asbarez, Ani Tadevosyan, May 15, 2015
Artweek LA May 13, 2015
Reuters, Why Donald Trump's Bid for Presidency Related to New Art Movement is Essential? Artist Kaloust Guedel Explains, Dec. 14, 2015
«Excess The New Norm» Գալուստ Գեոդելի Նկարչական Գործերի Անհատական Ցուցահանդէսը, Asbarez, by Ani Tadevosyan, October 29, 2014
Bienal Internacional De Curitiba 2013 (Exhibition Catalogue), 2013 
Գալուստ Գէօդելի Նկարը Լոնտոնի «Սաաթչի» Ցուցասրահում, Asbarez, by Ani Tadevosyan, August 15, 2013
Hetq, Saatchi Gallery in London to Display Work of Kaloust Guedel, by Anush Kocharyan, 24 May 2013
Yerevan Magazine, Nare Garibyan, September/October, 2012
Eyes On: Abstracts by Blaze Hill Press, page 53
Armenian Observer, Ruben Amirian,  Jan. 11, 2012 
International Dictionary of Artists by World Wide Art Books, 2011
"L'inhumanité de l'homme envers l'homme : voyage au bout de la nuit" / Exhibition : "Man's Inhumanity to Man : Journey Out of Darkness" April-2010
New American Paintings, 15th Anniversary edition by Open Studios Press, 2009, cover 
LA Daily News, Susan Abram, April 23, 2009, page 1
Man's Inhumanity to Men: Journey Out of Darkness ... (Exhibition Catalogue), 2009
Afisha, Larisa Pilinsky, Nov. - Dec. 2008
Masters of Today by MOT, 2008
Trends by MOT, 2008
GIAF (Exhibition Catalogue), 2008
BIAF (Exhibition Catalogue), 2008
The Armenian Mirror-Spectator, March 1, 2008 
The Armenian Reporter, March 1, 2008
Glendale News-Press, Art:the remix - Four artists will display works in New Mixed Media show at Brand Library and Art Galleries, By Joyce Rudolph Oct. 07, 2006
Peter Frank, "Pick of the Week: New Mixed Media," LA Weekly, 2006
Panorama, May 28, 2004 
Texas National, Stephen F. Austin State University (Exhibition Catalogue), 2003 
From Ararat To America- Contemporary Armenian Artists /Forest Lawn Museum (Exh. Catalogue), 2003
Voice of America (Radio Interview in Armenian), July 7, 2003
News-Press, April 29, 2003 
Los Angeles Independent, April 23, 2003 
The Artists Blue Book by Dunbier, Lonnie Pierson, 2003
Arts & Entertainment, April 23, 2003
17th Annual Greater Midwest International, Central Missouri State University (Exhibition Catalogue), 2002
The Artists Blue Book by Ask Art, 2001 
New American Paintings by Open Studios Press, December 2000
Gallery Guide, March 1991
Artspace, summer 1991
Artscene, December 1990 
50th National Midyear Exhibition, The Butler Institute of American Art (Exhibition Catalogue), 1986

References 

1956 births
Living people
21st-century American sculptors
21st-century American painters
21st-century American male artists
American male painters
American male sculptors
American contemporary painters
American conceptual artists
American abstract artists
American people of Armenian descent
Abstract painters
Artists from Los Angeles
Art in Greater Los Angeles
Modern painters
Neo-Dada
Painters from California
Soviet emigrants to the United States
Sculptors from California